Dippin' is an album by jazz saxophonist Hank Mobley released on the Blue Note label in 1966. It is the second of nine Blue Note sessions to feature Mobley alongside Lee Morgan during the trumpeter's second stint with the label.  It is also the second of nine consecutive Hank Mobley recording sessions to feature Billy Higgins.

Reception

The AllMusic review by Thom Jurek awarded the album 4.5 stars, calling it "one of Hank Mobley's finer moments" and "a fine document of Mobley's abilities as a bandleader and composer".

Track listing
All compositions by Hank Mobley except as noted
 "The Dip"7:57
 "Recado Bossa Nova" (Luiz Antonio, Djalma Ferreira)8:13
 "The Break Through"5:51
 "The Vamp"8:21
 "I See Your Face Before Me" (Arthur Schwartz, Howard Dietz)5:29
 "Ballin6:49

Personnel
 Hank Mobleytenor saxophone
 Lee Morgantrumpet
 Harold Mabern, Jr.piano
 Larry Ridleybass
 Billy Higginsdrums

Album production
 Rudy Van Gelder mixing
 Alfred Lionproducer
 Francis Wolffcover photo
 Reid Milescover design

References

Hank Mobley albums
1966 albums
Albums produced by Alfred Lion
Blue Note Records albums
Albums recorded at Van Gelder Studio